Ayi may refer to:

 Ayi (given name), a unisex given name
 Ayi language, a Sepik language spoken by approximately 400 people
 Anong people or Anong language of China (a misreading of the Chinese characters)
 A term for a domestic helper used by English speakers in China

See also

 AYI (disambiguation)